Tsilninsky District is an administrative and municipal district (raion), one of the twenty-one in Ulyanovsk Oblast, Russia. It is located in the north of the oblast. Its administrative center is the rural locality (a selo) of Bolshoye Nagatkino. Population: 27,543 (2010 Census);  The population of Bolshoye Nagatkino accounts for 19.8% of the district's total population.

References

Notes

Sources

Districts of Ulyanovsk Oblast